Soeripto (EYD: Suripto; 18 November 1934 – 7 January 2010) was an Indonesian military officer. He was commander of the Indonesian Army Strategic Reserves Command (Kostrad) and of Kodam I/Bukit Barisan, in addition to serving as the Governor of Riau between 1988 and 1998.

Early life
Soeripto was born in what is today Temanggung Regency on 18 November 1934. He completed high school in 1956, and enrolled at the Indonesian Military Academy in Magelang from which he graduated in 1960.

Career

Military
After graduating from the academy, Soeripto first commanded a platoon within Kodam Diponegoro. In 1965, he moved to Kodam Jaya, gradually rising through the ranks until he was commander of North Jakarta's military district by 1973, and that year he enrolled at the Army Command and Staff College as a lieutenant colonel. He then moved to military intelligence and public relations, serving as intelligence assistant to the commanders of Kodam Cenderawasih, Kodam Siliwangi, and Sumatra's Defence Command, in addition to becoming deputy chief of the army information service in 1977.

In 1982, Soeripto was appointed as chief of staff of the Army Strategic Reserves Command (Kostrad). He was further appointed to command Kodam Bukit Barisan in 1983, which covered North Sumatra, West Sumatra, and Riau. He was then appointed as Commander of Kostrad on 30 January 1986 as a major general, serving until 21 January 1987. He retired from the military on 12 November 1989. After his retirement, he was given a honorary promotion to the rank of lieutenant general on 1 September 1997.

As governor
Soeripto was appointed as an armed forces representative in the People's Representative Council in 1987. On 30 November 1988, Soeripto was voted in as the governor of Riau by the province's legislature, winning with 35 out of 45 votes. He was officially made governor on 10 December.

During his 10-year tenure as governor, Soeripto was noted as being supportive of the development of media outlets in the province. When he took office, there were no daily newspapers in the province, and Soeripto took steps to aid journalistic education, including taking part in the founding of Riau's first daily newspaper . He ended his term on 21 November 1998 and was replaced by Saleh Djasit.

Death 
Soeripto died on 7 January 2010, at the age of 75, after abruptly collapsing in his bathroom. He was rushed to the hospital, but was pronounced dead before he got there. He was buried the following day at Kalibata Heroes' Cemetery.

References

1934 births
2010 deaths
Indonesian generals
People from Temanggung Regency
Governors of Riau
Indonesian National Military Academy alumni
Members of the People's Representative Council, 1987